Sanmao may refer to:

 Sanmao (town) (三茅镇), town in Yangzhong City, Jiangsu, PR China

Written as :
 Sanmao (comics), a young comic book character created by Zhang Leping
 Sanmao (author), penname of Chen Ping, Taiwanese author
 Sanmao (actor), the pinyinized nickname of Hong Kong martial arts actor Sammo Hung
 Wanderings of Sanmao, a 2006 cartoon series based on the comic character